Die Bestie in Menschengestalt (German for "The beast in human form") is the fifth album by German rock band Die Ärzte. It is also the first album with their new bassist Rodrigo González and a comeback album after a five-year hiatus.

Track listing
"Inntro" – 0:06
"Schrei nach Liebe"  – 4:12
"Schopenhauer" – 3:06
"Für uns"  – 4:42
"Hey Huh (in Scheiben)"  – 1:29
"FaFaFa"  – 1:41
"Deutschrockgirl"  – 1:53
"Mach die Augen zu" – 4:00
"Gehirn-Stürm" – 4:04
"Mit dem Schwert nach Polen, warum René?" – 4:28
"Claudia (Teil 95)" – 0:09
"Die Allerschürfste" – 3:24
"Friedenspanzer" – 3:56
"Quark" – 2:45
"Dos corazones" – 3:47
"Kopfüber in die Hölle" – 2:54
"Omaboy" – 4:45
"Lieber Tee" – 4:47
"Wenn es Abend wird" – 6:36

Singles
1993: "Schrei nach Liebe"
1993: "Mach die Augen zu"
1994: "Friedenspanzer"
1994: "Quark"

Personnel
Farin Urlaub - guitar, vocals
Bela Felsenheimer - drums, vocals
Rodrigo González - bass guitar, vocals
Heinz Strunk - talk on track 9

Charts

References

1993 albums
Die Ärzte albums
German-language albums